The 1960 Israel Song Festival was the 1st edition of the annual Israel Song Festival. It took place in Tel Aviv and was held at Heichal HaTarbut on 2 May 1960 as part of the 1960 Independence Day celebrations. The show was hosted by Itzhak Shimoni.

Nine songs were selected to participate in the competition. Each song was performed twice on the night, once by a male singer and once by female singer, in order to give precedence to the song over the performing artist.

The winning song was "Erev Ba" (Evenfall), which was written by Oded Avisar and composed by Arie Levanon and was performed by Aliza Kashi and by Shimon Bar.

History
The idea for the competition came from Kol Yisrael producer Israel Daliyot after seeing people celebrating Domenico Modugno's victory in the 1959 Sanremo Music Festival while on vacation in Rome. Daliyot approached the Israel Broadcasting Service, and with involvement of the Prime Minister's Office, the first festival was held as part of the 1960 Independence Day celebrations, using budget allocated for the celebrations, rather than Kol Yisrael budget.

A committee headed by Minister of Health Yisrael Barzilai selected the nine participating songs out of hundreds of songs submitted. The winning song was allocated a prize of 1,500 pounds, while second and third prizes were IL1,000 and IL500. Each prize was split by the writer and composer of the song. The prize was awarded to the winners by Minister of Education & Culture, Abba Eban.

Format
Each song was allocated a male and female singer which performed the song one after the other. Following the performance an interval show was performed by Maîtrise de Radio France while the crowd present in the venue cast its votes. Following the interval, the third, second and first prizes were announced, with each song performed by the two performers (as a duet) after each announcement.

Songs
The song "Leil HaChag" was originally written by Iraqi Jew Shlomo Sha'ashu'a in Arabic and was translated to Hebrew by poet Yosef Lichtenboim. On the night, in each performance of the song, the first verse of the song was sung in Arabic.

Results

References

External links 
The Festivals

1960 in music
1960 in Israel
May 1960 events in Asia
Music competitions in Israel